Pure Mania is the debut album by the punk band the Vibrators.  It was released in 1977 on Epic Records and reached No. 49 in the UK Albums Chart.  The song "Baby Baby" was released as a single and punk band Stiff Little Fingers got their name from the song of the same name from this album.

Reception

Trouser Press writer Ira Robbins described the album as a "treasure trove of memorable ditties". AllMusic's Mark Deming said the album "isn't purist's punk, but it's pure rock & roll, and there's nothing wrong with that." Village Voice critic Robert Christgau described the album as "good new-fashioned rock and roll at its wildest".

Track listing
All songs by I.M. Carnochan except as indicated.

Side one
"Into the Future..." 
"Yeah Yeah Yeah" (Pat Collier)
"Sweet Sweet Heart" 
"Keep It Clean" (John Ellis)
"Baby Baby" 
"No Heart" 
"She's Bringing You Down"

Side two
"Petrol" (Pat Collier)
"London Girls"
"You Broke My Heart"
"Whips & Furs"
"Stiff Little Fingers" (John Ellis)
"Wrecked on You"
"I Need a Slave"
"Bad Time"

Personnel
The Vibrators
Knox – guitar, keyboards, vocals
John Ellis – guitar, vocals
Pat Collier – bass, vocals
John "Eddie" Edwards – drums
Technical
Simon Humphrey – engineering
Steve Cunningham – engineering
Keith Morris – photography

References

External links
 

1977 debut albums
The Vibrators albums
Epic Records albums